Broodwork is a "social practice based in Los Angeles", founded in 2009 by visual artist Rebecca Niederlander and architect Iris Anna Regn, that explores the intersection between creativity and family life.   Notable participants include individuals from various creative fields, including poet Elizabeth Alexander, writer and documentarian Alain de Botton, author and Families and Work Institute founder Ellen Galinsky, sculptor Tim Hawkinson, and architect Greg Lynn.

Overview 

Broodwork's projects are often experiments in interdisciplinarity that investigate using one methodology to explore another.

As a social practice entity, outside of curatorial installations, the creative output of Broodwork consists mostly of events, actions, and conversations. While adults are their primary audience, Broodwork's projects, particularly workshops and installations, are often designed for the two distinct audiences of adults and children, which is atypical for a contemporary art entity whose nature is not wholly pedagogic. Some of Broodwork's events involve parent-child interaction.

Exhibition History 

Broodwork has presented several major exhibitions since 2009, at venues including the Ben Maltz Gallery at the Otis College of Art and Design, Santa Monica Museum of Art, Trajector Art Fair (Brussels), and the Center for the Arts, Eagle Rock. These exhibitions range from large group exhibitions featuring many artists, to smaller, thematic projects featuring 3-4 artists. In exhibitions, Broodwork acts in diverse roles as curator, artist organizer, and artist. Typical for a social practice entity, some of Broodwork's projects have also been realized in non-gallery/museum spaces and via radio, or do not involve any object-making practice at all.

Non-Exhibition Activities 

Broodwork has acted as an advisor and collaborator to other entities and projects including the Architecture and Design Museum, the Los Angeles Forum for Architecture and Urban Design, and the Social Practices Art Network (SPAN). Their articles for the Herman Miller Company's LifeWork Blog are demonstrative of the group's ongoing participation in a public dialog of work-life balance issues.

Founders Niederlander and Regn have represented the practice and the practice's themes at academic conferences, such as Feminist Art Project's 2014 sister conference to the College Art Association annual conference and the Museum of Contemporary Art, Los Angeles Colloquy Series.

Participants 
Broodwork's organizational structure includes four advisors: artist and Museum Director Tibbie Dunbar, Families and Work Institute founder Ellen Galinsky, artist-educator Asuka Hisa, and Visual Understanding in Education (VUE) founder Phillip Yenawine.

Within Broodwork's own projects, collaborating artists and creatives vary from project to project, with many artists participating in multiple projects.  Due to Broodwork's emphasis on family, several collaborators have participated alongside their partners or spouses.  Below is a complete listing of the collaborators who have participated in Broodwork projects since its inception:

Publications 

Broodwork: It's About Time OTIS College of Art and Design. Los Angeles, California. 2012.

Images

References

External links

Interview with Rebecca Niederlander Iris Anna Regn on social practice
http://www.huffingtonpost.com/alla-kazovsky/Broodworks-its-about-time_b_856591.html Huffington Post article on the exhibition Broodwork: It's About Time.

American artist groups and collectives
Arts organizations based in California
Arts organizations established in 2009
2009 establishments in California